ZE Records was originally a New York-based record label, started in 1978 by Michael Zilkha and Michel Esteban.  It was reestablished by Esteban in 2003.

History
Michael Zilkha (b. 1954) is a British-born Oxford graduate of Iraqi descent, the son of Selim Zilkha, former owner of Mothercare, a major UK retail company, and the stepson of Cabinet member Lord Lever.  In the mid-1970s, Zilkha worked in the New York publishing industry and was a contributor to the Village Voice.

Michel Esteban (b. 1951) studied art in Paris and at the School of Visual Arts in New York, before returning to Paris in 1975 and opening the shop Harry Cover (a pun on "haricots verts"), which specialised in current rock music merchandise from the US and UK. The basement shop quickly became the rehearsal place for Parisian new wave bands. Between 1975 and 1976, Esteban published Rock News, which covered the birth of the punk rock movement in London, New York and Paris. In 1977 he published Patti Smith's books Witt and The Night, and Lizzy Mercier Descloux's first book Desiderata.

In 1977, Esteban signed French new wave band Marie et les Garçons, and asked John Cale - who had been introduced to him by Patti Smith - to produce them. Cale produced the single "Re Bop" in New York, and when he decided to start a record label with Jane Friedman he asked Esteban to assist.  Cale later introduced Esteban to Zilkha, and they first established SPY Records to release singles produced by Cale, including records by Harry Toledo, the Necessaries, Lester Bangs, Model Citizens and Bob Neuwirth.

Zilkha and Esteban then left to set up their own label, ZE Records, a name taken from the initials of their surnames, to record the new music emerging in New York and elsewhere from a fusion of punk, disco and new wave music.  Much of the music produced by the company later became categorised as either "Mutant Disco" – a title used for one of ZE's early compilation albums - or "No Wave".  Chris Blackwell - a friend of Esteban's then-girlfriend, fashion editor Anna Wintour - gave ZE worldwide exposure through the label's licence deal with Island Records.

Within a short time, ZE Records became one of the more hip labels of its time, signing up such new talent as James White and the Blacks, Was (Not Was), Kid Creole and the Coconuts, Lydia Lunch, Lizzy Mercier Descloux, Cristina, The Waitresses, Bill Laswell’s Material and Richard Strange, together with more established performers including John Cale and Suicide.  Many of its releases were first played at the Paradise Garage club in New York, starting point of Garage music.

ZE developed an independent and surrealist aesthetic identity.  It was described by John Peel in Melody Maker in 1980 as "the best independent record label in the world", and by Paul Tickell in The Face in 1982 as "the world¹s most fashionable label".  According to writer Andy Kellman:"At their most inspired, the artists on ZE found some middle ground between immensely accessible disco-pop and the avant-garde, without ever falling down the middle of the road. Music that appealed to Highlights-reading six year olds as well as their Village Voice-reading parents wasn't particularly common back then (surely there are no modern-day parallels); and it's just one of the voids that the ZE label filled, fostered by a very direct collision between the novelty of pop and the possibilities of artful experimentation."

The label's success and influence peaked around 1981-82. Esteban left New York in 1982, and ZE Records closed down in 1984.

Esteban continued to work with Lizzy Mercier Descloux, and with Lio, as well as other artists.  He restarted the ZE label in 2003 in France to record new artists, including Glasgow band Michael Dracula, as well as to reissue old material.  He lives today in Salvador da Bahia, Brazil, where he is working on music, contemporary arts and cultural project in general. Meanwhile, Michael Zilkha joined his family in working in the energy business, and is currently co-owner of a major renewable energy company based in Houston, Texas.

List of ZE recording artists

Discography

See also 
 List of record labels

References

External links
 Official site
  Japanese fan site
  Dusted magazine review of reissues

American record labels
Record labels established in 1978